Enzo Khasz (born 13 August 1993) is a water polo player from France. He was part of the French team at the 2016 Summer Olympics, where the team was eliminated in the group stage.

References

French male water polo players
Living people
1993 births
Olympic water polo players of France
Water polo players at the 2016 Summer Olympics
Competitors at the 2013 Mediterranean Games
Mediterranean Games competitors for France